Gone with the West is a 1975 American Western film starring James Caan and Stefanie Powers, directed by Bernard Girard.

The film is also known as Little Moon & Jud McGraw in Australia and Little Moon and Jud McGraw (American reissue title). It was filmed in 1969 under the title Man Without Mercy but did not find a cinema release.

Plot
The movie begins with a screenwriter driving out into the desert and meeting up with an old timer who spins him a tale of the Old West: Jud McGraw is a stagecoach driver who gets robbed by a gang led by Nimmo. He then gets blamed for stealing the gold. Nimmo also burns his farm and  kills his wife and son. When McGraw is released from prison, he finds the town Nimmo rules. Nimmo pretty much owns the whole town, including the sheriff, whose sister Billie is also Nimmo's woman. A quick-draw gunslinger, Kid Dandy, plays billiards and helps keep Nimmo safe from harm.  McGraw watches their drunken parties from the hills, including a gang rape of Little Moon, a native American woman who only speaks Spanish.  He later comes across Little Moon bathing in a spring. They begin traveling together while McGraw devises plans to attack the town and destroy Nimmo. Little Moon does much of the labor and tries to attract McGraw, but he is too preoccupied.They kill many of Nimmo's men and then go to town for the final plan. McGraw almost gets killed trying to steal dynamite from Nimmo's shack, but Little Moon saves him.

Cast
 James Caan as Jud McGraw
 Stefanie Powers as Little Moon
 Aldo Ray as Nimmo, Stage Robber
 Barbara Werle as Billie
 Robert Walker Jr. as Sheriff of Black Miller
 Sammy Davis Jr. as Kid Dandy
 Heather Angel as Old Little Moon / Narrator
 Mike Lane as Shark
 Elmore Vincent as Jerry
 L. Andy Stone as Old Jud
 Elizebeth Leigh as Gail
 Kenneth Adams as Artie
 Michael Conrad as Smithy
 Anne Barton as Smithy's Wife
 Paul Bergen as Singing Cowboy
 Fred Book as Piano Player
 Anthony Gordon as Prisoner
 Fabian Dean as Charlie
 Gillian Simpson as Jeb's Wife
 Chris Calabrese as Jeb's Son
 Noel Drayton as Wagon Driver
 James McHale as Farmhand
 Pepper Martin as Mimmo's Man

Soundtrack
 "A Man" (Words and Music by Roger Davenport and Bob Ross)

See also
 List of American films of 1975

Notes

External links
 
 
 
 

1975 films
1975 independent films
1975 Western (genre) films
American independent films
American Western (genre) films
Films directed by Bernard Girard
Films with screenplays by Douglas Day Stewart
1970s English-language films
1970s American films